Hum Tere Aashiq Hain ( We are your Lovers) is a 1979 Hindi-language romance film, produced and directed by Prem Sagar under the Sagar Art Enterprises
banner. It stars Jeetendra, Hema Malini in the pivotal roles and music composed by Ravindra Jain.

Plot
During the pre-independence era, Thakur Shamsher Singh is an autocratic slave driver of the villagers. Hence, their Sardar Santhalu rebels when benevolent Thakurani Kamla facilitates them. Since offended, Thakur commands his henchmen Jackson to blast the village. At the same time, pregnant Kamla moves for the delivery but in between, she is under labor when Sardar shields her. In tandem, Sardar’s wife Gulabbo is also about to deliver. Forthwith, she is blessed with a baby boy and Kamla a girl when it catches fire. In that chaos, the mothers die, the children transpose, and Thakur lefts Sardar’s child even aware of reality Sardar safeguards the baby girl. However, he is trumped-up charges and sentenced. Afterward, Thakur shifts to London along with Sardar’s child Anand.

Years roll by, and Anand is a doctor who follows Indian traditions and shows compassion toward the poor. Once, on an invitation of a renowned doctor Pradhan, he visits India and reaches his native place. Accordingly, he is acquainted with rustic Ram Kali the daughter of Thakur. He appreciates her integrity and promises too beneficial anytime. Soon, Ram Kali’s uncle coerced her to knit her with a goon Kaalia. During that plight, Anand shelters civilize, and falls for her. Then, Anand learns that his father has fixed his match with Jackson‘s daughter Lalitha. Hence, Anand makes a play with the help of Dr. Pradhan, by forging Ram Kali as a princess before his father. Being cognizant of the truth, Thakur plots to eliminate Ram Kali which Anand discovers and rushes to protect her. Meanwhile, Sardar is released and seeks to kill Thakur when they realize the fact and fuse. At last, Thakur & Sardar save their children and unite leaving the rivalry. Finally, the movie ends on a happy note with the marriage of Anand & Ram Kali.

Cast
Jeetendra as Dr. Anand 
Hema Malini as Ramkali 
Amjad Khan as Thakur Shamsher Singh 
Sujit Kumar as Legal Advisor Jackson
Om Shivpuri as Sardar Santhalu
Shreeram Lagoo as Dr. Pradhan 
Sheetal as Lalita 
Keshto Mukherjee as Mukherjee 
Birbal as Khushiram 
Ram Sethi as Nawab Mirza Bahadur Dauliya
Jankidas as Thakur's Munim 
Mac Mohan as Kaalia 
Shammi as Teacher

Soundtrack 
The film's music was composed by Ravindra Jain and the lyrics were written by Sahir Ludhiyanvi.

External links
 

1979 films
1970s Hindi-language films
Films scored by Ravindra Jain